is a 2007 Japanese drama series by KTV, a Kansai-based affiliate of Fuji TV. The show is also known as The Secret Garden or Hanazono's Secret. The theme song is "Baby Don't Cry" by Namie Amuro.

Plot 
A 28-year-old magazine editor who is tired of work and feels she doesn't have a life is assigned to be in charge of a very popular cartoonist with a lovely name, Yuriko Hanazono. But as she goes to Hanazono's residence/office, she is met by four men who seem to be her assistants. It turns out the men are brothers who form a team named Yuriko Hanazono by taking roles to create popular comics. The exhausted editor may find the key to being happy while she is being driven crazy by this unique gang of brothers.

Characters 
Kayo Tsukiyama (月山夏世 Tsukiyama Kayo)

Credits

Cast 
 Yumiko Shaku (釈由美子 Shaku Yumiko) - Kayo Tsukiyama
 Masato Sakai (堺雅人 Sakai Masato) - Wataru Kataoka
 Tetsuhiro Ikeda (池田鉄洋 Ikeda Tetsuhiro) - Osamu Kataoka
 Jun Kaname (要潤 Kaname Jun) - Satoshi Kataoka
 Kanata Hongo (本郷奏多 Hongō Kanata) - Hinata Kataoka
 Susumu Terajima (寺島進 Terajima Susumu) - Ichiro Tanaka
 Miki Maya (真矢みき Maya Miki) - Ryoko Kawamura
 Saori Takizawa (滝沢沙織 Takizawa Saori) - Minae
 Rinako Matsuoka (松岡璃奈子 Matsuoka Rinako)  - Misuzu Sugimoto
 Tetsushi Tanaka (田中哲司 Tanaka Tetsushi) - Shin'ichi Tamaru
 Yusuke Yamamoto (山本裕典 Yamamoto Yūsuke) - Takumi Tachikawa
 Shunsuke Daito (大東俊介 Daitō Shunsuke) - Miura
 Kei Yamamoto (山本圭 Yamamoto Kei) - Toru Kataoka

Staff 
 Director - Takashi Komatsu (小松隆志 Komatsu Takashi)
 Producers - Hideki Yoshijō (吉條英希 Yoshijō Hideki), Kōichi Tōda (遠田孝一 Tōda Kōichi), Tatsuya Itō (伊藤達哉 Itō Tatsuya)
 Screenwriter - Yūko Nagata (永田優子 Nagata Yūko)
 Music - Kyō Nakanishi (仲西匡 Nakanishi Kyō)

Episodes

Others
2 works with no relation to this TV series:
a manga written by Mihona Fujii sharing the same title.
an anime titled Anime Himitsu no Hanazono broadcast by NHK. An adaptation of Frances Hodgson Burnett's children's novel The Secret Garden.

External links 
  

2007 Japanese television series debuts
2007 Japanese television series endings
Japanese drama television series